K. Palaniswami was sworn in as Chief Minister of Tamil Nadu on 16 February 2017.

He was elected as the leader of AIADMK Legislature Party on 14 February 2017, after Chief minister elect V. K. Sasikala was convicted by the Supreme Court of India in the 20 year old disproportionate assets case, following the resignation of Chief minister O. Panneerselvam.

The Following List Of Ministers

Council of Ministers

Former Ministers

Achievements

The Government introduced various schemes like Kudimaramaththu Work, FAME India scheme and Amma Patrol in Tamil Nadu to ascertain the security of women and children in public places.

In 2019, The Chief Minister went on a 13-day tour in the United States, United Kingdom and United Arab Emirates to promote foreign investment in Tamil Nadu. While there he launched the Yaadhum Oore programme (lit. all countries, based on Puranauru 192) to encourage the Tamil diaspora to re-invest in Tamil Nadu. During trip he secured 3 lakh crores worth of foreign investment, a greater amount than even his predecessor Jayalalithaa did.

In February 2020, Palaniswami led Tamil Nadu government declared the Cauvery delta region as a Protected Special Agriculture Zone. The announcement was widely hailed by political parties and farmers organisations.

In 2020, Palaniswami led AIADMK government passed order for 7.5% Quota in Medical Admissions for Govt. School Students. He took action to set up government medical colleges in newly formed 11 districts which offered 1,650 more seats to then existing 3,400 seats.

Under this governance, Tamil Nadu was rated as the best governed state based on a composite index in the context of sustainable development according to the Public Affairs Index-2020 released by the Public Affairs Centre in Oct. 2020. Palaniswami is also praised for his administration during the coronavirus pandemic. Tamil Nadu was one of the few states that did not register negative growth in the period of pandemic.

During this regime, Tamil Nadu was the best performing big state overall from the year 2018 to 2021. With a gross state domestic product of $290 billion or Rs 21.6 lakh crore, Tamil Nadu became India's second-largest economy.

In 2020, the study “States of the State” of India Today, said that Palaniswami led Tamil Nadu has topped in 11 categories from a total of 12, including economy, tourism, infrastructure, inclusive development, law and order, along with entrepreneurship, cleanliness, environment, health, education and agriculture. Tamil Nadu had been chosen for this recognition for the third consecutive year.

References

Government of Tamil Nadu
All India Anna Dravida Munnetra Kazhagam
P
2017 in Indian politics
2010s in Tamil Nadu
2020s in Tamil Nadu
2017 establishments in Tamil Nadu
Cabinets established in 2017